In addition to federal elections for President and the House of Representatives, South Carolina held state elections on Tuesday, November 6, 2012.  Voters elected state senators, state representatives, solicitors and local officers, and voted in a statewide constitutional referendum.  The state legislative elections were dramatically impacted by a ruling by the South Carolina Supreme Court that disqualified many candidates before the primary election.

South Carolina Senate

Republicans maintained their majority in the State Senate, increasing their majority from eight seats to nine.

South Carolina House of Representatives

Republicans maintained their majority in the State House, increasing their majority from 28 seats to 32 seats.

Constitutional Referendum

Voters voted on Amendment 1, which amended Section 8 of Article IV of the South Carolina constitution so that the lieutenant governor would be elected on the same ticket with the governor, rather than being elected in a separate election.  The proposed amendment passed.

External links
South Carolina State Election Commission
South Carolina State Races in 2012 campaign finance data for state races from Follow the Money
Ballotpedia pages on South Carolina State Senate elections and South Carolina State House elections

References

 
South Carolina